The maddalam or madhalam (Malayalam: മദ്ദളം) मद्दलम , ମଦ୍ଦଳମ , మద్దళమ్ , ಮದ್ದಳಂ is a drum made out of the wood of the jackfruit tree. It has two sides for playing, made out of leather, and has different kind of sounds on each side. The maddalam is a heavy instrument which is hung around the waist of the person playing, and the player stands all the while to perform. The maddalam is a vital instrument in traditional Kerala percussion ensembles like Panchavadyam, Keli and Kathakali orchestra.

Except for the central projection, the Maddalam resembles a Mridangam in shape.

Etymology 
The name Madhalam is derived from the word Mardhalam which means 'one which receives pressure'. In Sanskrit the instrument is called as Mardhalam.

Using style 
In ancient times Madhalam was played by suspending it from the neck of the player and later in the 1920s Madhalam maestro Venkichan Swamy changed the style to the way it was suspended from the waist of the player.

See also
 Pandi Melam
 Panchari melam
 Thayambaka
 Panchavadyam
 Maddalam and Chenda Keli
 Kalamandalam Sankara Warrier

References

Drums
Kathakali
Asian percussion instruments
Indian musical instruments